Fontolan is an Italian surname. Notable people with the surname include:

 Davide Fontolan (born 1966), Italian footballer
 Silvano Fontolan (born 1955), Italian footballer and manager

Italian-language surnames